La neve nel bicchiere is a 1984 Italian drama film directed by Florestano Vancini. It is based on an eponymous novel written by Nerino Rossi.

The film entered the competition at the 41st Venice International Film Festival.

References

External links

1984 films
Italian drama films
Films directed by Florestano Vancini
Films scored by Carlo Rustichelli
1980s Italian films